Lara is a seat in the Victorian Legislative Assembly. It covers much of the area between the western suburbs of Melbourne and the regional city of Geelong. Most of the voters come from the very northern suburbs of Geelong, including Lara, Bell Post Hill and Corio. The district also includes the country towns of Anakie, Balliang and Little River but these add very few voters to the district.

The electorate was created at the 2002 state election, replacing the abolished Geelong North. A safe Labor seat like its predecessor, it was easily won by Peter Loney, formerly the MP for Geelong North. Loney faced a preselection challenge ahead of the 2006 election from upper house member John Eren, whose seat was being abolished as part of sweeping government reforms to the chamber. Facing certain defeat at the hands of the factionally connected Eren, Loney chose to retire. Eren faced little challenge in the general election, and was easily returned as the new member for Lara.

Members for Lara

Election results

References

External links
 Electorate profile: Lara District, Victorian Electoral Commission

2002 establishments in Australia
Electoral districts of Victoria (Australia)
Geelong
Barwon South West (region)